The Institute of Directors (India) was established in India on 12 July 1990, as a not-for-profit, apex association of Directors under the India's 'Societies Registration Act XXI of 1860' to improve their professional competence. It has since grown to associate with more than 30,000 leaders from Govt, PSU and Private organisations.

Over the years, the Institute of Directors, India, has been debating on a number of Boardroom issues for their Governance, Development, Sustainability and Inclusive Growth. IOD, India is committed to its endeavor of building boards of the future. The IOD, India's activities extend from Boardroom Trainings, Researches, Publications, Board Advisory Services and Monthly Lectures to Workshops and networking of Members, Directors and Global Leaders through various National & International Conventions and platforms to debate the issues of topical interest, held in India, and abroad. Over the last 30 years, IOD, India has been organising its annual Global Conventions in India, Dubai, Singapore, London and Europe focusing on various boardroom issues and also the Global Business Meets by bringing together industry leaders, policy makers and board members from various parts of the world.

References

External links
Golden Peacock Awards

Business organisations based in India
Institute of Directors
Corporate governance in India